German Township is one of the fifteen townships of Harrison County, Ohio, United States. As of the 2010 census the population was 805.

Geography
Located in the northeastern corner of the county, it borders the following townships:
Springfield Township, Jefferson County - north
Salem Township, Jefferson County - northeast
Wayne Township, Jefferson County - southeast
Green Township - south
Archer Township - southwest
Rumley Township - west
Loudon Township, Carroll County - northwest

No municipalities are located in German Township.

Name and history
It is one of five German Townships statewide.

Government
The township is governed by a three-member board of trustees, who are elected in November of odd-numbered years to a four-year term beginning on the following January 1. Two are elected in the year after the presidential election and one is elected in the year before it. There is also an elected township fiscal officer, who serves a four-year term beginning on April 1 of the year after the election, which is held in November of the year before the presidential election. Vacancies in the fiscal officership or on the board of trustees are filled by the remaining trustees.

References

External links
County website

Townships in Harrison County, Ohio
Townships in Ohio